The 4th Miss Chinese International Pageant, Miss Chinese International Pageant 1992 was held on January 26, 1992 in Hong Kong. The pageant was organized and broadcast by TVB in Hong Kong. Miss Chinese International 1991 Yen-Thean Leng crowned Rosemary Chan of Toronto, Ontario, Canada as the winner. It was also the first victory for Canada and North America.  As of 2010, Toronto would win the crown for two more times.

Pageant information
The theme to this year's pageant continues to be "The Traditions of the Dragon, The Embodiment of Beauty" 「龍的傳統  俏的化身」.  The Masters of Ceremonies were Eric Tsang and Philip Chan.

Results

Special awards
Miss Friendship: Sherine Seng 鍾雪蓮 (Auckland)
Miss Oriental Charm: Rosemary Chan 陳曼莉 (Toronto)
Miss Ethnic Dress: Amy Kwok 郭藹明 (Hong Kong)
Media's Favorite Award: Rosemary Chan 陳曼莉 (Toronto)

Contestant list

Crossovers
Contestants who previously competed or will be competing at other international beauty pageants:

Miss World
 1991: Taipei, : Karen LIN (representing )

External links
 Johnny's Pageant Page - Miss Chinese International Pageant 1992

TVB
1992 beauty pageants
1992 in Hong Kong
Beauty pageants in Hong Kong
Miss Chinese International Pageants